Giles Kevin Stille (born 10 November 1958) is an English former  professional footballer who played as a midfielder in the Football League for Brighton & Hove Albion. He went on to coach and manage in Sweden. He is the current manager of Swedish Division 1 side Assyriska.

Life and career
Stille was born in 1958 in Westminster. He attended Epsom College, a rugby-playing school, and took a degree in social history at Westfield College while playing football part-time for Kingstonian. He joined Brighton & Hove Albion in 1979, and turned professional after he graduated. He was never a first-team regular, and his career was blighted by a diagnosis of diabetes and a series of injuries including a chronic back problem. He remained with the club until 1984, contributing 4 goals from 29 appearances, and then returned to Kingstonian and worked as a mortgage broker. He played for Tegs SK in the Swedish lower divisions, and spent two English seasons with Crawley Town before returning to Sweden on a permanent basis to play and coach.

Under Stille's management, IK Tord won the 1995 Division 3 (fourth-tier) title, and he led Jönköpings Södra to two consecutive titles in 1998 and 1999. After three seasons with Husqvarna FF, he was appointed assistant manager of Superettan club Kalmar FF. The team won the 2003 Superettan title, and with it promotion to the Allsvenskan, and he stayed at the club for two seasons in the top flight. He returned to Husqvarna in 2006, and in January 2007, signed a three-year contract as manager of Superettan club Östers IF. Instead of challenging for the title as expected, Östers were heading for relegation when Stille was sacked in mid-September. Stille returned to Kalmar in 2009 and left in 2012. The club were looking for an assistant who was prepared to live in Kalmar; Stille's family were settled in Huskvarna.

After working in China, Stille returned to Sweden to take charge of Division 1 side Assyriska.

References

1958 births
Living people
Footballers from Westminster
English footballers
Association football midfielders
Kingstonian F.C. players
Brighton & Hove Albion F.C. players
Crawley Town F.C. players
Umeå FC players
BK Forward players
Isthmian League players
English Football League players
English football managers
Jönköpings Södra IF managers
Östers IF managers
People educated at Epsom College
Alumni of Westfield College
English expatriate sportspeople in Sweden